John Seeley (1872 in Woodhull, Steuben County, New York – 1932) was an American physician and politician from New York.

Life
Seeley was a member of the New York State Assembly (Steuben Co., 2nd D.) in 1911 and 1912; and was Chairman of the Committee on the Soldiers' Home in 1911.

He was a member of the New York State Senate (43rd D.) in 1913 and 1914; and was Chairman of the Committee on Public Health.

He was buried at St. Catherine's Cemetery in Addison, New York.

Sources
 Official New York from Cleveland to Hughes by Charles Elliott Fitch (Hurd Publishing Co., New York and Buffalo, 1911, Vol. IV; pg. 360)
 New York Red Book (1911, pg. 166)
 DR. JOHN SEELEY DEAD; ONCE A STATE SENATOR in NYT on November 2, 1932
 St. Catherine's Cemetery transcriptions at RootsWeb

1872 births
1932 deaths
Democratic Party New York (state) state senators
People from Woodhull, New York
Democratic Party members of the New York State Assembly
Physicians from New York (state)